A list of highest points typically contains the name, elevation, and location of the highest point in each of a set of geographical regions. Such a list is important in the sport of highpointing. A partial list of highpoint lists is below:

Worldwide

Physical geography

Global 
 List of highest mountains on Earth
 Summits farthest from the Earth's center
 List of islands by highest point

By geographical region 
 List of highest points on each continent
 List of elevation extremes by country
 List of countries by highest point
 List of highest points of African countries
 List of highest points of Asian countries
 List of highest points of European countries
 List of highest points of Oceanian countries
 List of elevation extremes by region

Human geography 
 List of highest towns by country
 List of highest cities
 List of highest large cities

Within a particular country

Highest points of administrative divisions 

 List of Brazilian states by highest point
 List of highest points of Canadian provinces and territories
 List of Chinese administrative divisions by highest point
 List of the highest points of the German states
 List of Indian states and union territories by highest point
 List of Indonesian provinces by highest point
 List of Irish counties by highest point
 List of Italian regions by highest point
 List of Nigerian states by highest point
 List of highest points of Norwegian counties
 List of South African provinces by highest point
 List of Swiss cantons by elevation (including highest points in each Swiss canton)

Within the United Kingdom 
 List of highest points in the United Kingdom
 List of English counties by highest point
 List of counties of England and Wales in 1964 by highest point
 List of Welsh principal areas by highest point
 List of Scottish counties by highest point
 List of Scottish council areas by highest point
List of Northern Ireland counties by highest point
 List of Northern Ireland districts by highest point
 List of highest points in London

Within the United States 
 List of U.S. states and territories by elevation (including highest points in each U.S. state)
 List of highest U.S. county high points
 List of highest points in California by county
 List of Colorado county high points
 List of highest points in Oregon by county
 List of highest points in Nevada by county
 List of highest points in Washington by county
 List of Florida's highest points
 List of highest United States cities by state or territory

Mean elevations of administrative divisions 
 List of Swiss cantons by elevation (including mean elevations of each Swiss canton)
 List of U.S. states and territories by elevation (including mean elevations of each U.S. state)
 List of highest counties in the United States

See also
 Lists of mountains
 List of mountains by elevation
 List of tallest buildings and structures

 
Lists of places